The 1953–54 FAW Welsh Cup is the 67th season of the annual knockout tournament for competitive football teams in Wales.

Key
League name pointed after clubs name.
FL D1 - Football League First Division
FL D3N - Football League Third Division North
FL D3S - Football League Third Division South
SFL - Southern Football League
WLN - Welsh League North

Fifth round
Eight winners from the Fourth round and ten new clubs. Ebbw Vale & Cwn get a bye.

Sixth round
Three winners from the Fifth round plus Ebbw Vale & Cwn. Six clubs get a bye to the Seventh round.

Seventh round
Two winners from the Sixth round, plus six clubs who get a bye in the previous round.

Semifinal
Flint Town United and Cardiff City played at Wrexham, Chester and Newport County played at Cardiff, replay at Wrexham.

Final
Final were held at Wrexham.

External links
The FAW Welsh Cup

1953-54
Wales
Cup